Onstaborg may refer to:
 Onstaborg (Sauwerd), a former borg in Sauwerd, Netherlands
 Onstaborg (Wetsinge), a former borg in Wetsinge, Netherlands